"Weißt du wohin wir gehen" is a song by Austrian recording artist Christina Stürmer. It was written by Robert Pfluger and Alexander Kahr for her second studio album, Soll das wirklich alles sein? (2004), while production was helmed by the latter. The song was released by Polydor Records as the album's third single in Austria, where it reached number eight on the Austrian Singles Chart.

Formats and track listings

Charts

References

External links
 

2004 singles
Christina Stürmer songs
Songs about death
2004 songs
Polydor Records singles
Songs written by Alexander Kahr